CKJM-FM is a radio station, broadcasting from Chéticamp, Nova Scotia, Canada on 106.1 FM. Owned by La Cooperative Radio-Chéticamp, the station has broadcast as a full-time French-language community radio service since 1995.

History
CKJM's history stems back to 1991, when the station was on the air intermittently on a special events license issued by the CRTC and Industry Canada, which allowed it to be on the air for only up to 28 days per event. The station broadcast from 1991 to 1994 for these events, as approved by the CRTC:

L'Escaouette se diffuse, August 1 to 4, 1991
Courons la mi-Carême, March 16 to 29, 1992 
L'Escaouette en Fête, 1992 
Fêtons la mi-Carême March 14 to 21, 1993 
Célébrons le centenaire de notre église and Le festival de l'Escaouette, 1993 
Laissons rentrer les mi-carêmes, 1994 
L'Escaouette en Fête, 1994 

On February 17, 2014, the CRTC approved Radio Chéticamp's application to operate a repeater in Sydney, broadcasting at 97.5 MHz with an average effective radiated power of 830 watts (non-directional antenna with an effective height of antenna above average terrain of 6.5 metres).

The station is a member of the Alliance des radios communautaires du Canada.

References

External links
  CKJM-FM
  CKJM-FM
 
 

Kjm
Mass media in the Cape Breton Regional Municipality
Kjm
Kjm
Radio stations established in 1991
1991 establishments in Nova Scotia